Southcott may refer to:

Places

Canada
 Southcott Pines, Ontario, a town in Canada

England
 Southcote, Bedfordshire, a hamlet near Linslade, also known as Southcott
 Southcott, Cornwall, a hamlet near Jacobstow
 Southcott, North Devon, a hamlet near Bideford
 Southcott, Frithelstock, a hamlet near Langtree, in Torridge, Devon
 Southcott, Winkleigh, a hamlet near Winkleigh, in Torridge, Devon
 Southcott, West Devon, a hamlet near Okehampton
Southcott Cross, a Dartmoor cross
 Southcott, Wiltshire, a hamlet near Pewsey

People
 Andrew Southcott (born 1967), Australian politician
 Ernest Southcott (1915–1976), Anglican priest
 Heather Southcott (1928–2014), Australian politician
 Joanna Southcott (1750–1814), English self-described religious prophetess
 Mary Southcott (1862–1943), Newfoundland nurse and hospital administrator
 Ronald Vernon Southcott (1918–1998), Australian medical zoologist

Other uses 

 Southcott family, a prominent family from Devon and Cornwall, England
 Southcottism, a religious movement formed by Joanna Southcott in England in the early 19th century

See also
 Southcote (disambiguation)

English-language surnames
Surnames of English origin
English toponymic surnames